Nancy Berg (July 9, 1931 – February 4, 2022) was an American model and actress.

Berg was born in Kenosha, Wisconsin to Paul Axel Berg and Dorothy Esther ( Schanock) Berg. She ran away from home there in 1947 and moved to Detroit to become a model. By 1960, she was earning $40,000 per year. Berg was on the front cover of Vogue four times, starting in 1953, and was Esquire'''s "Lady Fair" for May of 1956. She was also the star and sole performer for a 1955 New York television program entitled Count Sheep with Nancy Berg which aired five nights a week from 1:00 to 1:05 in the morning. "The nightgown-clad Miss Berg would appear, get into bed, perform a bit of business, such as read from Romeo and Juliet or eat grapes off a toy Ferris wheel, and then, in extreme close-up, whisper a good night to the camera and pretend to go to sleep as animated sheep jumped over a fence. Her manager stated, 'A lot of people watch it. God knows why.'"

In 1962, Berg toured with Bob Cummings in a production of Tunnel of Love.

Berg was married to actor Geoffrey Horne on February 6, 1958, with whom she had a child. They divorced in 1962. She was also married to, and divorced from, Alan Elliott and Richard Praeger in the 1960s. She died on February 4, 2022, at the age of 90, in New York.

Filmography
 Fail-Safe (1964) as Ilsa Wolfe
 Thunder in Dixie (1964) as Karen Hallet
 Count Sheep with Nancy Berg'' (1955)

References

1931 births
2022 deaths
21st-century American women
Actors from Kenosha, Wisconsin
Female models from Wisconsin